Ryu Sun-jeong or Ryoo Soon-jung (1459–1512) was a Korean scholar-official during the Joseon period. A disciple of Kim Jong-jik, he participated in the Jungjong coup of 1506  together with other Neo-Confucianism philosophers and scholars, and became Chief State Councillor of Joseon in 1512.

Popular culture
 He was portrayed by Yoo Hyung-gwan in the 2017 KBS2 TV series Queen for Seven Days.

External links 
 Ryu Sunjeong:Korean historical person's information 
 Ryu Sunjeong

References 

16th-century Korean philosophers
Korean politicians
Neo-Confucian scholars
Korean educators
16th-century Korean writers
Joseon scholar-officials
Korean scholars
Korean Confucianists
Year of birth uncertain
1512 deaths